The 1987 Island Games were the second Island Games, and were held in Guernsey, from September 10 to September 17, 1987.

Medal table

Sports
The sports chosen for the games were:

External links
 1987 Island Games

Island Games, 1987
Island Games, 1987
Island Games
Sport in Guernsey
International sports competitions hosted by the Channel Islands
Multi-sport events in the Channel Islands
Island Games